Paingar (Chinese: 白嘎; Pinyin: Báigā) is a township in Biru County, the Tibet Autonomous Region of the China.

See also
List of towns and villages in Tibet

Notes

Populated places in Tibet